Robert L. Stevenson was an American college basketball coach. He was the first head coach of the DePaul University men's basketball team. Serving from 1923 to 1924, he guided them to an 8–6 record.

References

Year of birth missing
Year of death missing
American men's basketball coaches
DePaul Blue Demons men's basketball coaches